Joan Brownlow Hanham, Baroness Hanham, CBE (née Spark; born 23 September 1939) is a former member of the House of Lords. She sat as a Conservative.

She was Parliamentary Under Secretary of State at the Department for Communities and Local Government from 2010 to 2013, and was leader of the Kensington and Chelsea London Borough Council from 1989. She was succeeded by Cllr Merrick Cockell, who became leader in April 2000.

She was made a Life peer as Baroness Hanham, of Kensington in the Royal Borough of Kensington and Chelsea on 15 July 1999. That same year, Hanham was a candidate for the re-run Conservative nomination to be Mayor of London, losing to Steve Norris. She retired from the House of Lords on 22 July 2020.

National Health Service

The daughter of Alfred Spark and Mary Mitchell, she married, in 1964, Dr Ian (or Iain) William Fergusson Hanham, a respected oncologist and also a member of the Kensington and Chelsea London Borough Council from 2002 until his death on 12 April 2011.

Hanham was Chairman of St. Mary's Hospital NHS Trust from 2000 to 2007 and of Westminster Primary Care Trust. She became a Freeman of the City of London in 1984 and became a CBE in 1997. She was Parliamentary Under Secretary of State in the Department for Communities and Local Government from 2010 until 2013. She was awarded the Freedom of the Royal Borough of Kensington and Chelsea on 19 January 2011. In January 2014 she was appointed as the interim chair of health sector regulator Monitor.

References

External links
Announcement of her introduction at the House of Lords House of Lords minutes of proceedings, 27 July 1999
Biography Department for Communities and Local Government
Profile at New Statesman

1939 births
Living people
Councillors in the Royal Borough of Kensington and Chelsea
Conservative Party (UK) life peers
Commanders of the Order of the British Empire
Life peeresses created by Elizabeth II
Women councillors in England